Arquette is a surname; people with this name include the following members of the Arquette family:

 Alexis Arquette, American transgender actress
 Cliff Arquette, American actor, father of Lewis Arquette
 David Arquette, American actor and a former WCW World Heavyweight Champion, and ex-husband of American actress Courteney Cox
 Lewis Arquette, American actor, father of Alexis, David, Patricia, Richmond and Rosanna
 Patricia Arquette, American actress
 Rosanna Arquette, American actress

French-language surnames